On Thorns I Lay is a Greek death-doom metal band founded in Athens in 1992.

History 
They started as a death metal band under the name of Paralysis. Together with bands such as Rotting Christ, Septic Flesh, Necromantia, and Nightfall they started to spread their name in the local and global underground scene. In 1993 they changed their name to Phlebotomy and released the EP Dawn Of Grief. The next year they recorded the Voluptuous demo which drew the attention of Holy Records label.

In 1994, they again changed their name to 'On Thorns I Lay' in reference to Shakespeare. (The name was suggested by their friend, Nightfall's vocalist/bassist Efthimis Karadimas) and released their first album Sounds of Beautiful Experience, which was closer to the death/doom style. Through the years the band's music evolved to include gothic metal elements.

They have since released nine albums altogether, and have played in Greece and in Europe together with Dream Theater, In Flames, Anathema, Amorphis, Katatonia, Tiamat, The Gathering, Satyricon,Septic Flesh and many more.

On 6 November 2015, the band released their seventh album, Eternal Silence, which had been recorded in 2004, right before the band went on hiatus.

The band, after a hiatus of 14 years signed a contract with Alone recs / The Stone Circle Spain and The Vinyl Division. They returned with an album of new material, and on 12 March 2018 they released their eighth album Aegean Sorrow, recorded at Devasoundz studios (Rotting Christ, Septic Flesh), mixed and mastered by Dan Swanö at Unisound Studio. The album was a return to the band's atmospheric death-doom metal roots.

On 21 February 2020, On Thorns I Lay released their ninth studio album Threnos, a heavy atmospheric doom-death metal album, following in the steps in its predecessor, and of the band's roots.

Formation 
 Peter “Invoker” Miliadis (vocals/bass)
 Chris Dragamestianos (guitar)
 Nikolas Perlepe (guitar)
 Antonis Ventouris (keyboards)
 Stelios Darakis (drums)

Past members

 Stefanos Kintzoglou (vocals)
 Akis Pastras (guitar)
 Fillipos Koliopanos (guitar)
 Giannis Koskinas (bass)
 Jim Ramses (bass)
 Maxi Nil (vocals)
 Minas Ganeau (guitar/vocals)
 Michael Knoflach (bass)
 Evans M. (drums)
 Fotis Chondroudakis (drums)
 Thanazis Hatzaiagapis (guitars)
 Fernando Drăgănici (keyboards)
 Elena Doroftei (violin)
 Gina Grammatikou (vocals on Orama)
 Claudia J. (vocals)
 Marius  (vocals)
 Marcela Buruiana (vocals)
 Rotting Soul (drums 1995–1997)
 Roula (keyboards, female vocals 1997)
 Andrew Olaru (drums 1999)
 Ionna Doroftei
 Dimitris Leonardos

Timeline

Discography 
  Dawn Of Grief (EP under their former name Phlebotomy) (1993)
 Sounds of Beautiful Experience (1995)
 Orama (1997)
 Crystal Tears (1999)
 Future Narcotic (2000)
 Angeldust (2001)
 Egocentric (2003)
 Eternal Silence (2015)
 Aegean Sorrow (2018)
 Threnos (2020)

References

Sources 
Books 

(Books in which On Thorns I Lay is mentioned as a notable band in the gothic metal genre)
 Jérôme Alberola, Les belles et les bêtes, Anthologie du rock au féminin, Camion blanc, 2012, p. 260
 Stéphane Leguay, "Métal Gothique" in Carnets noirs, éditions E-dite, 3e édition, 2006, 

Biography
 
 Biography on MusicMight

Interviews
 Interview with the band in English
 interview with the band on Lords of Metal Site in English
 Interview with the band in German

Reviews

External links 
Official website

Greek death metal musical groups
Greek heavy metal musical groups
Greek gothic metal musical groups
Musical groups established in 1992
Musical groups from Athens